Matt Dinerman (born July 13, 1992) is an American Thoroughbred horse racing announcer. He grew up in San Diego, California and graduated from Chapman University college in Orange County, California.

Dinerman grew up attending races at Del Mar Racetrack, near his parents' home in San Diego. When he was in high school, he worked for California-based trainer John W. Sadler and later worked as part of the Del Mar Publicity Team. Dinerman was hired as the track announcer at Emerald Downs in June 2015, becoming the youngest announcer in the United States at the time. His first live race call came during an audition at Emerald Downs in May 2015.

In the fall of 2016, Matt Dinerman was hired as the racing announcer and race analyst at Golden Gate Fields in Berkeley, California.

Dinerman has appeared on and also written for various horse news media outlets, including The Daily Racing Form, The Blood-Horse, TVG Network, TVG2, The San Diego Union Tribune and The Washington Times.

References

1992 births
Living people
Chapman University alumni